Ylva Erika Holst (born 8 April 1979) is a former Swedish ice hockey player. She was a member of the Sweden women's national ice hockey team. She won a silver medal at the 2006 Winter Olympics and a bronze medal at the 2002 Winter Olympics.

Playing career

Minnesota Duluth
Born in Varberg, Sweden, Holst played for the Minnesota–Duluth Bulldogs women's ice hockey program. She was part of the Bulldogs team that won the first three NCAA women's championships in 2001, 2002 and 2003.

Sweden
She played with the Segeltorps IF in the Riksserien (Sweden league elite). She has represented Sweden in nine Women's World Ice Hockey Championships. In ice hockey at the 2002 Winter Olympics, Holst led the Swedish team with five points in five games. This marked the second Olympics in which she was the team leader in scoring. Four years later, in the win over the United States in the semifinal game in Turin, Holst had one assist.

Personal

References

1979 births
Ice hockey players at the 1998 Winter Olympics
Ice hockey players at the 2002 Winter Olympics
Ice hockey players at the 2006 Winter Olympics
Ice hockey players at the 2010 Winter Olympics
Lesbian sportswomen
Living people
LGBT ice hockey players
Swedish LGBT sportspeople
Medalists at the 2002 Winter Olympics
Medalists at the 2006 Winter Olympics
Minnesota Duluth Bulldogs women's ice hockey players
Olympic bronze medalists for Sweden
Olympic ice hockey players of Sweden
Olympic medalists in ice hockey
Olympic silver medalists for Sweden
People from Varberg
Swedish expatriate ice hockey players in the United States
Swedish women's ice hockey centres
Sportspeople from Halland County
20th-century Swedish women